Ivan Parejo (born March 15, 1987) is a Spanish aerobic gymnast who finished 1st in the Men's Individual event at the 10th Aerobic Gymnastics World Championships held in Ulm.

References

External links
 
 

1987 births
Living people
Spanish aerobic gymnasts
Male aerobic gymnasts
Medalists at the Aerobic Gymnastics World Championships
Competitors at the 2009 World Games
World Games gold medalists